Saucon Valley School District is a midsized suburban public school district located in Northampton County, Pennsylvania in the Lehigh Valley region of eastern Pennsylvania.  It serves the borough of Hellertown and Lower Saucon Township. Saucon Valley School District encompasses approximately 20 square miles. 

Students in grades nine through 12 attend Saucon Valley High School in Hellertown. As of the 2021–22 school year, the school district had a total enrollment of 2,001 students between all three of its schools, according to National Center for Education Statistics data.

According to 2000 federal census data, the school district serves a resident population of 15,490. In 2009, district residents' per capita income was $26,599 while the district's median family income was $59,049.

Schools
Saucon Valley High School
Saucon Valley Middle School
Saucon Valley Elementary School

References

External links
Official website

School districts in Northampton County, Pennsylvania